Coelopoeta maiadella is a moth in the superfamily Gelechioidea. It is found in Yukon, Canada.

The species was described in 1995 by Lauri Kaila from a single specimen from Yukon, Canada. The only specimen known was a male collected in a light trap on 16 July 1985 by K. Mikkola. This specimen, the holotype, is kept at the Zoological Museum, University of Helsinki, Finland. The females, caterpillars and host plants of this species remain unknown.

The length of the fore-wings is about 5 mm. The ground colour of the fore-wings is mottled grey, with scattered white and dark grey scales. The hind-wings and underside of the wings are grey.

References

Moths described in 1995
Gelechioidea